Demon Slayer: Kimetsu no Yaiba is a Japanese anime series based on the manga series of the same title, written and illustrated by Koyoharu Gotouge. The second season adapts volumes seven to eleven (chapters 55–97) of the manga series and ran in two cours, with the first part titled Demon Slayer: Kimetsu no Yaiba – Mugen Train Arc, a seven-episode recompilation of "Mugen Train" as featured in the 2020 anime film, featuring new music and an all new original episode, which aired from October 10 to November 28, 2021. The second part is titled Demon Slayer: Kimetsu no Yaiba – Entertainment District Arc which aired 11 episodes, from December 5, 2021, to February 13, 2022. The season was directed by Haruo Sotozaki, with character designs by Akira Matsushima, and animation produced by Ufotable; staff and cast from the first season and Demon Slayer: Kimetsu no Yaiba – The Movie: Mugen Train also returned.

Aniplex of America licensed the series outside of Asia and streamed it on Funimation and Crunchyroll. Muse Communication licensed the second season in Southeast Asia and South Asia; they streamed it on iQIYI, Bilibili, WeTV, Viu, Netflix, and Disney+.


Episode list

Home media release

Japanese

English

Notes

References

2021 Japanese television seasons
2022 Japanese television seasons
Demon Slayer: Kimetsu no Yaiba

Fiction about hypnosis
Suicide in television
Television censorship in China
Works set on trains